The Switzerland national alpine ski team represents Switzerland in International alpine skiing competitions such as Winter Olympic Games, FIS Alpine Ski World Cup and FIS Alpine World Ski Championships.

World Cup
Swiss alpine skiers won 20 overall FIS Alpine Ski World Cup, 8 with men and 20 with women and won 617 races.

Update to the end of 2021-22 season

Titles

Men

Women

Wins

Men

Women

See also
Switzerland at the Olympics

References

External links
 

Alpine ski
Switzerland
Alpine skiing organizations